Djalma Henrique da Silva (born 24 November 1975), known as just Djalma, is a former Brazilian footballer.

Biography

Portugal
Djalma briefly played for Estrela da Amadora. In January 2002, he was back to Brazil for Sport Recife.

He then played for cross-town rival Santa Cruz, and left for Portugal again for Paços de Ferreira on 13 August 2004. With Rincón, Júnior and Djalma, the team won Liga de Honra and returned to Portuguese Liga.

Return to Brazil
Djalma was signed by Gama on 26 July 2005 for the remainder of Campeonato Brasileiro Série B.

Bulgaria
On 6 July 2007, he was signed by PFC Cherno More Varna in the A PFG. and remained with the team until early 2008.

Late career
In July 2008, he signed a one-year contract with Central Sport Club, for Campeonato Brasileiro Série C.

In May 2009, he signed a 4-month contract with Centro Limoeirense, for Copa Pernambuco. In 2010, he played for Crato for 2010 Campeonato Cearense and moved to Tiradentes in March. In May, he was signed by Timbaúba in the Campeonato Pernambucano Série A2. In December 2010 he returned to Crato. In May, he once again moved to Timbaúba. In December 2011 he was signed by Crato for the third time.

Honours
Liga de Honra: 2005

References

External links
Profile at futpedia  

Profile at Portuguese Liga 

Brazilian footballers
C.F. Estrela da Amadora players
F.C. Paços de Ferreira players
PFC Cherno More Varna players
Primeira Liga players
First Professional Football League (Bulgaria) players
Brazilian expatriate footballers
Brazilian expatriate sportspeople in Bulgaria
Brazilian expatriate sportspeople in Portugal
Expatriate footballers in Portugal
Expatriate footballers in Bulgaria
Sportspeople from Pernambuco
1975 births
Living people
Crato Esporte Clube players
Timbaúba Futebol Clube players
C.D. Pinhalnovense players
Association football midfielders